Leibhart Site may refer to:

Byrd Leibhart Site
Oscar Leibhart Site